Caboolture railway station is located on the North Coast line in Queensland, Australia. It serves the urban centre of Caboolture in the Moreton Bay Region.

History

Caboolture station opened in June 1889 as part of the extension of the North Coast Line from Petrie, which opened in March 1888. As part of the electrification of the line from Petrie, the existing station building was replaced and a new island platform built. The new station opened on 16 November 1985, while the electrification opened on 28 June 1986.

The Kilcoy line branched off to the north-west. It opened in December 1909, closing in September 1996. An old turntable is located on the eastern side. Extensive stabling sidings exist around the station

Services
Caboolture is the terminating point for all stops City network services to Brisbane, many continuing to Ipswich, Rosewood and Springfield Central.

Caboolture is also served by Citytrain services to Nambour and Gympie North that only call at limited stops south of Caboolture. To relieve congestion on the single track North Coast line north of Beerburrum, the rail service is supplemented by a bus service operated by Kangaroo Bus Lines on weekdays between to Nambour as route 649.

Caboolture is also served by long-distance Traveltrain services; the Spirit of Queensland, Spirit of the Outback and the Bundaberg and Rockhamption Tilt Trains.

Services by platform

Bus routes by stop 
The following bus routes services Caboolture railway station:

Transport links
Caboolture Bus Lines operate nine routes to and from Caboolture station:
640: to Woorim/Bribie Island via Bribie Island Park & Ride
643: to Bribie Island Park & Ride via Sandstone Point
651: to Morayfield station & Caboolture West
652: to Beachmere
653: to Morayfield station via Bellmere
654: to Morayfield station via Bellmere
655: to Caboolture Hospital
657: to Caboolture North
9999: to Toorbul and Donnybrook (Thursday only)

Kangaroo Bus Lines operate two routes to and from Caboolture station:
649: to Nambour station
660: to Redcliffe
Christensen Bus & Coach operate one route to and from Caboolture station:
895: to Kilcoy via Woodford
From 16 January 2023, Christensen Bus & Coach will operate one additional route to and from Caboolture station:

 896: to Woodford

Coast & Country operate a service to the Queensland University of Technology and TAFE campuses during school terms.

Purser's Coaches operate a service from Caboolture station to Murgon on Monday, Wednesday and Friday.

Kinetic  operate a Sunshine Coast University service during school terms.

References

External links

Caboolture station Queensland Rail
Caboolture station Queensland's Railways on the Internet

Caboolture, Queensland
North Coast railway line, Queensland
Railway stations in Moreton Bay Region
Railway stations in Australia opened in 1889